John Lewis Thomas Jr. (May 20, 1835 – October 15, 1893) was an American politician.

Born in Baltimore, Maryland, Thomas studied law and was admitted to the bar in 1856, commencing practice soon afterwards in Cumberland, Maryland.  He also served as city counselor of Cumberland in 1856 and 1857.  He moved to Baltimore in 1857, continued the practice of law, and also served as city solicitor of Baltimore from 1860 to 1862.  He was a delegate to the State constitutional convention of 1863 and State's attorney from 1863 to 1865.

In 1865, Thomas was elected as an Unconditional Unionist to the Thirty-ninth Congress to fill the vacancy caused by the resignation of Edwin H. Webster and served from December 4, 1865, to March 3, 1867.  He was an unsuccessful Republican candidate for reelection in 1866 to the Fortieth Congress.  After Congress, he served as collector of the port of Baltimore from 1869 to 1873 and again from 1877 to 1882.  He died in Baltimore and is interred in Greenmount Cemetery.

References

External links 

1835 births
1893 deaths
Politicians from Baltimore
Unconditional Union Party members of the United States House of Representatives from Maryland
Maryland Republicans
Politicians from Cumberland, Maryland
19th-century American politicians
Bancroft Prize winners
Lawyers from Cumberland, Maryland
Members of the United States House of Representatives from Maryland